The Los Angeles Harbor Region is in Los Angeles County, California. The area is impacted by the harbor complex consisting of the Port of Los Angeles and the Port of Long Beach.

Geography

City of Los Angeles
The city of Los Angeles' official Harbor Area Planning Commission area encompasses the following community plan areas (CPAs):
Harbor Gateway CPA
San Pedro CPA
Wilmington–Harbor City CPA
Port of Los Angeles CPA

Mapping L.A.

As defined by Mapping L.A. of the Los Angeles Times, the region, which includes the city of Los Angeles as well as other cities and unincorporated areas of Los Angeles County, is a 193.09-square-mile area flanked by South Los Angeles or Los Angeles County's Southeast Region on the north, Orange County on the east, the Pacific Ocean on the south, and the South Bay region on the west.

Cities and neighborhoods within the Harbor Region are:

Avalon
Carson
Catalina Island
Harbor City, Los Angeles
Harbor Gateway, Los Angeles
Hawaiian Gardens
Lakewood
Long Beach
Neighborhoods of Long Beach, California
Rancho Dominguez
Signal Hill
San Pedro, Los Angeles
Two Harbors
West Carson
Wilmington, Los Angeles

Demographics

In 2000 the region was composed of Latinos, 39.4%; whites, 30.7%; Asians, 13.2%, Blacks, 13%, and others, 3.6%.  West Carson was the most ethnically diverse neighborhood within the region, and Wilmington was the least diverse.

The wealthiest neighborhood was Lakewood, and the poorest was Wilmington.

Twenty-one percent of all residents aged 25 and older had a four-year degree. Signal Hill had the most post-secondary graduates and Wilmington the fewest.

Rancho Dominguez was the neighborhood with the oldest population, while Hawaiian Gardens was the youngest.

Renters made up 51.7% of the population. The neighborhood with the highest rental rate was unincorporated Santa Catalina Island, while the one with the most homeowners was Rancho Dominguez.

See also

 Port of Long Beach
 Port of Los Angeles

References

External links
  Stories of Los Angeles Harbor Area

 
Geography of Los Angeles
Los Angeles County, California regions
Los Angeles Police Department